Robert Steen House is a historic home located in East Fallowfield Township, Chester County, Pennsylvania. The house was built about 1846, and is a -story, two bay, stuccoed stone, vernacular Greek Revival style dwelling. It has a small rear extension.

It was added to the National Register of Historic Places in 1985.

References

Houses on the National Register of Historic Places in Pennsylvania
Greek Revival houses in Pennsylvania
Houses completed in 1846
Houses in Chester County, Pennsylvania
National Register of Historic Places in Chester County, Pennsylvania